Hojjatabad (also Romanized as Ḩojjatābād; also known as Hojjat Abad Hoomeh Zarand) is a village in Ravar Rural District, in the Central District of Ravar County, Kerman Province, Iran. At the 2006 census, its population was 352, in 101 families.

References 

Populated places in Ravar County